Norman Francis Borrett (1 October 1917 –  was a Cambridge hockey and squash Blue, an England and Great Britain field hockey player, a county cricketer, a tennis player, and an England and Great Britain squash player. Described in his obituary in The Times as "arguably Britain's most talented post-war all-round amateur sportsman" Norman Borrett was a pupil and later a schoolmaster at Framlingham College. The story of Norman Borrett can be found in the book Master Sportsman by Richard Sayer. This book is dedicated to Norman's widow, Mullie.

He captained England 11 times in his 30 hockey internationals and at the 1948 Summer Olympics he captained the Great Britain field hockey team, which won the silver medal, playing in all five matches as inside-left and scoring 10 goals.

He won the British Amateur Squash Championship in the first five years after the war, from 1946 to 1950, not losing a set in any of the finals. He played 11 times for England at squash, and captained in most of them. He played cricket for Essex three times (1939 and 1946) and for Devon 50 times from 1947 to 1950. He once qualified for Wimbledon too, but didn't have time to compete in it.

He was born in Wanstead, London, and died in Colchester.

References

External links
 
profil
https://web.archive.org/web/20120324201146/http://www.framcollege.co.uk/of-society/merchandise.php
dataOlympics profile
Cricinfo profile

1917 births
2004 deaths
Rugby union players from London
English male field hockey players
English rugby union players
English cricketers
Essex cricketers
Devon cricketers
Olympic field hockey players of Great Britain
British male field hockey players
Field hockey players at the 1948 Summer Olympics
Olympic silver medallists for Great Britain
Olympic medalists in field hockey
Medalists at the 1948 Summer Olympics